LG Energy Solution Ltd. (LGES) is a battery company headquartered in Seoul, South Korea. LGES is one of the largest battery makers in the world alongside CATL, Panasonic, SK Innovation, and Samsung SDI.

History

LG Chem Energy Solution Business Division (1992-2020)
LG Chem started a battery business after LG Group chairman Koo Bon-moo visited the United Kingdom Atomic Energy Authority office in 1992. After the visit, Koo brought rechargeable battery samples and began research into the emerging technology. LG Chem produced Korea's first lithium-ion battery in 1999 and began supplying automotive batteries for the Chevrolet Volt produced by General Motors in the late 2000s. Later, the company became a battery supplier to global car makers, including Ford, Chrysler, Audi, Renault, Volvo and SAIC Motor.

LG Energy Solution (2020-present)
In September 2020, LG Chem announced that it would spin off its battery business to cope with growing demand from global automotive manufacturers. LG Chem's battery business officially became a separate company and changed its name to LG Energy Solution Ltd. in December 2020. It subsequently undertook an IPO process to secure funds in order to increase its battery production capacity and debuted on the Korea Exchange in January 2022.
In the first half of 2022, LG Energy Solution is ranked second in the world with a market share of 14 per cent according to SNE research.

Controversies
According to General Motors, manufacturing defects in batteries supplied for Chevrolet Bolt caused 13 confirmed battery fires. The faulty batteries were produced in LGES plants in South Korea and Michigan, and GM pursued reimbursement from LG. In the end, LGES and LG Electronics agreed to pay GM up to $1.9 billion for the recalls on every car produced since 2016.

See also
List of electric-vehicle-battery manufacturers

References

External links
 

LG Corporation
Battery manufacturers
Electric vehicle battery manufacturers